Acropteris ciniferaria is a moth of the family Uraniidae first described by Francis Walker in 1866. It is found in Oriental tropics of India, Sri Lanka, to Sulawesi and Lesser Sundas.

Description
Its wings are typically white with a creamy tinge. Markings pale brown. Fasciae of forewing diffuse and obscure. Hingwing angle characterize by a black fleck and smaller flecks on either side. Caterpillar fusiform (spindle shaped), whereas head is round and narrow. Body translucent green with a dark dorsal line. Body skin polished and glossy in appearance with setae on tubercles. Pupa claviform and cremaster contain a pair of hooked shafts. Pupation occurs in a cocoon on the upper surface of leaf. Host plant is Dregea species.

References

Moths of Asia
Moths described in 1866
Uraniidae